American Made is the debut album by Wakefield, released in 2003.

Promotion
To support the album, Wakefield opened for Avril Lavigne on North American dates on the second leg of her Try to Shut Me Up Tour.

Track listing

Personnel
Vince Jones – Digital Editing
Brian Gardner – Mastering
John O'Brien – Programming, loops
L.A. Reid – Executive producer
Matt Wallace – Producer
Luke Ebbin – Producer
Gary Tole – Engineer
Mike Landolt – Engineer
Posie Muliadi – Engineer
Gary Tole – Mixing
Jeffrey Schulz – Art direction
Chapman Baehler – Photography
Joshua Sarubin – A&R
Robert Mainwaring – A&R
Peter Doris – Assistant
Rich Tapper – Assistant
Anthony Ruotolo – Assistant
Courtney Walter – Design
Joe-Mama Nitzberg – Creative designer
Wakefield – Main performer
Ryan Escolopio – Guitar, vocals
Aaron Escolopio – Drums, background vocals
J.D. Tennyson – Guitar, vocals
Mike Schoolden – Bass, background vocals
Tim Pagnotta – Background vocals

References

2003 albums
Wakefield (band) albums
Arista Records albums
Albums produced by Matt Wallace
Albums produced by Luke Ebbin